The General Telecommunications Authority was the telecommunications regulator of the Gaddafi government in Libya. It was based in Tripoli, and headed by Muhammad Gaddafi, the oldest son of the ruler.

As of April 2011, it has been reported to have lost de facto control of the telecommunications infrastructure in the rebel-controlled areas of Libya.

See also 
 Libya Telecom & Technology
 Free Libyana

References

External links 
 Libyan General Telecommunications Authority English-language home page

Telecommunications regulatory authorities
Communications in Libya
Regulation in Libya